Adam Mitchell may refer to:

Adam Mitchell (footballer, born 1908), Scottish professional footballer for Bradford City and Wrexham
Adam Mitchell (footballer, born 1993), English professional footballer for Sunderland
Adam Mitchell (footballer, born 1996), New Zealand footballer
Adam Mitchell (Doctor Who), a fictional character in the British science fiction television series Doctor Who
Adam Mitchell (golfer) (born 1987), American golfer
Adam Mitchell (ice hockey) (born 1982), Canadian ice hockey player
Adam Mitchell (songwriter) (born 1944), singer-songwriter